Denzer may refer to:

 Denzer, Wisconsin, United States
 Roger Denzer (1871–1949), American baseball player

See also
 Danzer, a surname